Fiskerton railway station, is on the Nottingham to Lincoln Line, situated  south-east of the small town of Southwell and serves the village of Fiskerton in Nottinghamshire, England.

History
The station opened on 4 August 1846 by the Midland Railway. It was taken over by the London, Midland and Scottish Railway in 1923, and by British Rail in 1948.

A signal box was installed at the station in 1902. This Midland Railway Type 3a box was downgraded to a gate box from 2 December 1934. 

A new junction was laid between Fiskerton and the Rolleston Junction to Southwell line in 1929 to allow mineral trains from Mansfield and district to access Nottingham without reversing at Rolleston Junction. At the same time a new signal box was built to a Midland Railway Type 3c design with a 30 lever frame and gate wheel to operate the level crossing barriers. The curve closed on 1 March 1965 and the railway junction was abolished.

It is managed by the East Midlands Railway, which provides services to the station.

Signalling on the line was upgraded in 2016 when the manual signal boxes were decommissioned and control transferred to the East Midlands Integrated Electronic Control Centre at Derby.

In 2017, Network Rail announced that the platforms would be extended to cater for longer trains.

In 2020 Network Rail announced a plan to relocate the signal box to the Vale of Berkley Railway in Gloucestershire.

Stationmasters

Thomas Marston 1851
H. Briggs until 1860
John Pick 1861 - 1864 (afterwards station master at Beeston)
S Cobb from 1864
Joseph Monney (or Minney) ca. 1870 until 1873
Henry Hawkins 1873
J. Blackwell 1873 - 1877 (formerly station master at Tonge and Breedon)
W. Booth 1875 - 1877 (called upon to resign)
Thomas Braddock 1877 - 1879
Edward Presgrave 1879 – 1883 (afterwards station master at Barrow upon Soar)
G. Butler 1883 - 1888
William Tunn 1888 - 1890 (formerly station master at Kirkby Stephen, afterwards station master at Kirkby in Ashfield) 
William Henry Higginson 1890 – ca. 1914
G. Jay 1915 – 1925 (afterwards station master at Desford)
William George Dudderidge from 1925 (also station master at Rolleston Junction) 
Arnold Foster 1936 – 1942
H.J. Lane until 1947
F.W.E. Clarke from 1947 (formerly stationmaster at Widmerpool)
A. Newcombe ca. 1951 ca. 1955

Facilities
The station is unstaffed and offers limited facilities other than two shelters, bicycle storage, timetables and modern help points. The full range of tickets can be purchased from the guard on the train at no extra cost as there are no retail facilities at this station.

Services
East Midlands Railway operate all services at Fiskerton using Class 156, 158 and 170 DMUs.

The typical off-peak service in trains per hour is:
 1 tph to  via 
 1 tph to 

On Sundays, there is roughly an hourly service between Nottingham and Lincoln from mid-morning onwards with no service to and from London.

References

Gallery

External links

Railway stations in Nottinghamshire
DfT Category F2 stations
Former Midland Railway stations
Newark and Sherwood
Railway stations in Great Britain opened in 1846
Railway stations served by East Midlands Railway
1846 establishments in England